Colonel Henry William Lowry-Corry DL, JP (30 June 1845 – 6 May 1927), styled The Honourable from birth, was a British Army officer and Conservative politician.

Background
Born at Castle Coole, County Fermanagh on 30 June 1845 and baptised at the local parish church at Derryvullen a month later, he was the youngest son of Armar Lowry-Corry, 3rd Earl Belmore and his wife Emily Louise Shepherd, youngest daughter of William Shepherd. Lowry-Corry was educated at Eton College and then at the Royal Military Academy, Woolwich. Thereafter he went to Trinity College, Cambridge, where he graduated with a Bachelor of Arts in 1866 and a Master of Arts four years later. He lived at Edwardstone Hall in Suffolk. There is a memorial to him in the church of St Mary the Virgin in Edwardstone.

Career
Lowry-Corry was commissioned into the 1st Bn. Coldstream Guards, serving in the Suakin Expedition in 1885, for which he received the Egypt Medal with a clasp and the Khedive's Star. In 1903, he retired as colonel. He entered the British House of Commons in 1873, sitting as a Member of Parliament (MP) for County Tyrone until 1880. Lowry-Corry was a deputy lieutenant for Suffolk and represented it also as a justice of the peace. He was chairman of the county's Quarter Sessions, a vice-chairman of the Territorial Force Association.

Family
On 21 September 1876, he married Hon. Blanche Edith Wood, daughter of Charles Wood, 1st Viscount Halifax by his wife Lady Mary Grey, fifth daughter of Charles Grey, 2nd Earl Grey and had issue:

 Emily Mary Lowry-Corry (b. 14 December 1882 d.?), who was married, as his second wife, on 1 February 1911 to Major Sir Richard Nelson Rycroft, 5th Baronet
 Alice Frances Louisa Lowry-Corry (22 May 1885 –8 August 1978), who was a justice of the peace for Suffolk and was unmarried
 Lieutenant Colonel Sir Henry Charles Lowry-Corry MC DL (20 February 1887 –23 December 1973), who fought in the First World War, where he was wounded. He gained the rank of Lieutenant-Colonel in the Royal Artillery and was awarded the Military Cross. He also fought in the Second World War between 1939 and 1942, before he became a Prisoner of War. He was married to Betty Alice Adeline Proby, daughter of Colonel Douglas James Proby (see Proby Baronets) and Lady Margaret Frances Hely-Hutchinson (17 May 1889 –1978), daughter of Richard Hely-Hutchinson, 4th Earl of Donoughmore, on 27 April 1920 and had issue.  His daughter, Edith, married Michael Carver, Baron Carver. He lived at Edwardstone Hall in Suffolk.
 Frederick Richard Henry Lowry-Corry (13 May 1890 –30 September 1915), who fought as a lieutenant in the "C" Bty. 47th Bde. Royal Field Artillery in the First World War and died from wounds received in action at Ypres, aged 25. He is buried at Etaples Military Cemetery in France.

References

External links 
 
 

1845 births
1927 deaths
Alumni of Trinity College, Cambridge
Coldstream Guards officers
Deputy Lieutenants of Suffolk
Members of the Parliament of the United Kingdom for County Tyrone constituencies (1801–1922)
People educated at Eton College
UK MPs 1868–1874
UK MPs 1874–1880
Graduates of the Royal Military Academy, Woolwich
Younger sons of earls
Irish Conservative Party MPs
Henry